The 1957 Lady Wigram Trophy was a motor race held at the Wigram Airfield Circuit on 25 January 1957. It was the sixth Lady Wigram Trophy to be held and was won by Peter Whitehead in the Ferrari 555/860 for the third time in succession.

Classification

References

Lady Wigram Trophy
Lady
January 1957 sports events in New Zealand